The noctuid (owlet) moth genus Cydosia is the only member of the tribe Cydosiini in the subfamily Acontiinae. The genus was erected by James Duncan with John O. Westwood in 1841. The few species occur from Argentina along the Andes to the Caribbean and Central America, reaching into the southern United States. The unusual format for the authority citation is explained at Butterflies and Moths of the World as "The difficulty can best be overcome by attributing Westwood with anonymous junior authorship."

Species
 Cydosia aurivitta Grote & Robinson, 1868
 Cydosia curvinella Guenée, 1879 (syn: Cydosia phaedra Druce, 1897)
 Cydosia garnotella Guenée, 1879
 Cydosia hyva E. D. Jones, 1912
 Cydosia mimica Walker, 1866
 Cydosia nobilitella Cramer, [1779]
 Cydosia primaeva Draudt, 1927
 Cydosia punctistriga Schaus, 1904
 Cydosia rimata Draudt, 1927
 Cydosia tessellatilla Strecker, 1899

References

Acontiinae